Andrew Daniel Clinch MD JP (28 November 1867 – 1 February 1937), was an Irish rugby union forward who played club rugby for Dublin University and international rugby for Ireland and the British and Irish Lions.

Biography
Educated at Belvedere College S.J. Andrew Daniel (Coo) Clinch represented Leinster, Ireland and the British and Irish Lions in a distinguished playing career and later became president of the Irish Rugby Football Union. He was a member of the squad on the 1896 British Lions tour to South Africa.

His son, James ("Jammie") Clinch, also played rugby for Ireland and the British and Irish Lions.

His grandfather James Clinch was a jeweler and made Claddagh Rings in Galway in the early 1800's 

His great-grandson Peter Clinch is an Irish academic and economist, who has served as Chairperson of Science Foundation Ireland.

His great-great-granddaughter Catherine Clinch stars in the Irish language film An Cailín Ciúin

References

1867 births
1937 deaths
Ireland international rugby union players
Irish rugby union players
British & Irish Lions rugby union players from Ireland
Rugby union forwards
Wanderers F.C. (rugby union) players
Dublin University Football Club players
People educated at Belvedere College
Burials at Goldenbridge Cemetery
Rugby union players from Dublin (city)